Kanslihushögern (English: The Chancellery Office Right) is a political concept in Sweden that originated during the 1980s in the so-called "right-wing" of the Swedish Social Democratic Party and was strongly represented in the Cabinet Office and the Ministry of Finance during this time.

Kanslihushögern advocated the Nordic model, with increased emphasis on markets, called the Third Way Policy. Members of this Social Democratic policy-making set claimed that greater economic efficiency and free choice, while maintaining a strong social safety-net, was the necessary future for Sweden.

Important spokesmen of this viewpoint were, among others, Kjell-Olof Feldt, Erik Åsbrink and Klas Eklund. Kanslihushögern was an important part of the then ongoing "Wars of the Roses" within the Swedish Social Democratic Party. It was a long ideological power struggle between the party's left- 
and right-wings.

Political history of Sweden
1980s in Sweden
1980s in politics